Enteromius roussellei is a species of ray-finned fish in the genus Enteromius which is endemic to the Longa River in Angola.

References 

 

Endemic fauna of Angola
Enteromius
Taxa named by Werner Ladiges
Taxa named by Johannes Voelker
Fish described in 1961